Rate Your Music (often abbreviated to RYM) is an online collaborative database of music releases and films. Users can catalog items from their personal collection, review them, and assign ratings in a five-star rating system. The site also features community-based charts that track highest-rated releases.

History
Rate Your Music was founded on December 24, 2000, by Seattle resident Hossein Sharifi, who is still active on the site under the username "sharifi". The first version of the site, "RYM 1.0," allowed users to rate and catalog releases, as well as to write reviews, create lists and add artists and releases to the database. Over time, other features were added, like cover art, a forum section and private messaging.

On August 7, 2006, "RYM 2.0" was launched, introducing database features such as tracklists, record labels, catalog numbers, and more fields such as concerts and venues. As a result of rising expenses, the website ceased relying solely on donations in 2006 and began receiving revenue from other sources. Namely, the two changes were commission-based links to online music retailers, and Google AdSense links (which registered users can elect not to view). In May 2009, Rate Your Music started to add films to its database.

Development on "RYM 3.0" was announced in July 2010, with a soft "RYM 2.5" release appearing in July 2013 that included a dedicated classical music section, separation of DJ mixes and mixtapes, and split album support. January 2014 marked an announcement that the two versions would be worked on simultaneously. It was also announced that the website would split the music and film side into unique domains, and that RYM would be incorporated into the company name Sonemic.

In November 2015, Rate Your Music launched an IndieGogo crowdfunding campaign to fund "three new sites devoted to discovering music, films, and video games", Sonemic, Cinemos, and Glitchwave respectively. The fundraiser was 122% funded on December 30, 2015, with $67,552 raised. Initially, Sonemic was to be the next version of RYM, with a new name, design and features. The initial deadline for site launch was planned to April 2016, but later it was changed to beta releases. The latest status update on IndieGogo campaign was in May 2018. The funds raised by crowdfunding campaign were spent on RYM's infrastructure. 

On July 2017, Sonemic Beta 4 was launched, available to be browsed publicly and accessible to test for members who have joined Rate Your Music before July 11, 2017, with temporary database snapshot of the same date. Sonemic Beta 5 was planned to be released in August 2018, but was postponed repeatedly. The latest update on development status was in March 2020.
In November 2020, Rate Your Music received a massive overhaul which included a graphic redesign, an updated chart system, and more subscriber options and features. It was also announced that the development of Sonemic and the music side of Rate Your Music would be conflated and that Cinemos's features would slowly be brought over to the film side of the site, as well.

Features
The main idea of the website is to allow the users to add albums, EPs, singles, videos and bootlegs to the database and to rate them. The rating system uses a scale of minimum a half-star (or 0.5 points) to maximum five stars (or 5 points). Users can likewise leave reviews for RYM entries as well as create user profiles. Rate Your Music is generated jointly by the registered user community (artists, releases, biographies, etc.); however, the majority of new, edited content must be approved by a moderator to prevent virtual vandalism. 

Browsing and registration is free and a subscription plan is available that includes additional features, such as expanded chart metadata. 

From 2004 to 2016, Rate Your Music allowed a select number of unsigned artists to host their MP3 files of recordings on the main server. Members of the site's community released several tribute/cover albums as free downloads.

Statistics 
By December 2011, there were approximately 370,000 user accounts on Rate Your Music. Around one half of the people visiting the website come from the United States, the United Kingdom or Canada, the other half primarily coming from Western Europe (especially Scandinavia and the Netherlands), as well as from Poland, Russia, Mexico, Brazil and Australia. 

As of April 2018, RYM had over 40,000 user-created lists ranging from "popular lists" to "ultimate box sets," which uncover various music genres, including rarest micro-genres. The top rated album on the RYM charts is Kendrick Lamar's To Pimp A Butterfly, a position that was previously held by Radiohead's OK Computer for over a decade, while the bottom rated album is Rob Scallon and Doug Walker's Nostalgia Critic's The Wall.

By December 2018, Rate Your Music had indexed over 3,700,000 releases by over 1,255,000 artists. As of January 31, 2020, the site had 662,475 users.

Impact 
Rate Your Music has been credited with helping previously unknown artists and albums rise to popularity, most prominently Have a Nice Life's debut album Deathconsciousness and Sweet Trip's 2003 album Velocity : Design : Comfort. Anonymous South Korean musician Parannoul was discovered by the website after his second album To See the Next Part of the Dream appeared on the website's front page. Chat Pile guitarist Luther Manhole said, "Our popularity on RYM definitely contributed to us having this career-type-thing, 100%.", as the band's self-released debut EP topped the weekly charts due to fortunate timing.

Reception 
Rate Your Music has been received generally favorably. M.O.V.I.N [UP]s Maurício Angelo praised RYM as "the best guide to discovering new music, in all styles, of any tempo". Hypebot staff found Rate Your Music "snobby and multilingual and people come to show off their various incredible music collections. I’ve loved it for ages". Wireds Andy Baio deemed it "quirky". Radio Waves Karel Veselý praised Rate Your Music and Discogs as "[t]he cult music portals". 

Flashmode Arabia staff commended RYM as "a fantastic way to discover new music" but critiqued its user experience. The Daily Stars Deeparghya Dutta Barau called it "one of those hip sites that offer functionality over aesthetics". Similarly, Newonce'''s staff was somewhat critical, stating the site was "Extremely ugly visually (its creators like the consistency: RYM has not changed the layout to this day), but quite useful". 

Centuries of Sound founder James Errington said "[he consulted] websites like Rate Your Music and Acclaimed Music to pick top hits" for his year-by-year mixtapes of the 20th century. Pigeons and Planess Adrienne Black highlighted the forums, stating, "if you haven't already spent half your day exploring the above, there are the highly active, engaged threads to dive in to". Evolver.fms Eliot Van Buskirk advised readers to "Keep a wishlist on rateyourmusic.com".  

In an interview with PopMatters, American electronic musician Skylar Spence noted that he would use Discogs and Rate Your Music to find "a lot of cool, old, hidden treasures that way". 

While detailing the history of the band Lightnin 3, Stereogums Nick Patrin observed that "Rate Your Music, exhaustive as its user-built catalog is, comes up empty for the band and the label alike". Likewise, Patrin found Australian electroclash artist Dsico's entries on RYM and Allmusic to be "incomplete ghost pages".

Rate Your Music has been endorsed by music critic Anthony Fantano.

Other references
In an article previewing an upcoming Phish Halloween concert, in which the band traditionally covers an album in its entirety, JamBases Scott Bernstein noted that all but Waiting for Columbus "[were] in the top 700 on RateYourMusic, which compiles fan ratings".

Selecting "Logan Rock Witch" from Richard D. James Album as their favorite Aphex Twin track, The Quietuss John Doran remarked "this should result in something that sounds like a mad man’s breakfast of kooky cacophony. (And a quick look at Rate Your Music reveals that plenty of self-professed AFX fans actually do see it this way.)"

Appraising Kairon; IRSE!'s album Ruination, Stereogums Doug Moore saw that the band "built a big following on Rate Your Music by combining the slightly heftier variants of prog and pysch (sic) with shoegaze". 

In a piece concerning Mark E. Smith, Patrin noted that The Fall's This Nation's Saving Grace was "the album that Rate Your Music still ranks as their best by a sliver as of less than 24 hours after Smith’s death". 

Covering the Japanese band Fishmans album 98.12.28 Otokotachi no Wakare, The Michigan Dailys Sayan Ghosh noted the "classic music lover’s past-time of perusing through internet boards such as Rate Your Music".

In response to Swedish symphonic metal band Therion's album Beloved Antichrist, Stereogums Ian Chainey opined that "extremely fickle user bases of Rate Your Music, Encyclopaedia Metallum, and Prog Archives all rate Therion’s albums highly".

Commenting on the release of Retribution Body's album Self Destruction, Tiny Mix Tapess Lijah Fosl offered "a reminder that 'dark ambient' is more than just a random rateyourmusic.com categorization". 

In a retrospective on the American rock band Duster, Noiseys Brian Coney described their discography as "a muted legacy of life-changingly Good Music that has rewarded bummed-out indieheads with a penchant for Soulseek and RateYourMusic genre lists in the intervening 17 years". 

In a review for American musician Yves Tumor's album Safe in the Hands of Love, The Brown Daily Herald''s Katherine Ok associated plunderphonics with "crate-digging, list-obsessed 'Rate Your Music' users".

See also
 List of online music databases

References

External links 

American music websites
Companies based in Seattle
Internet properties established in 2000
Online music and lyrics databases
Social cataloging applications